TH1  may refer to:
 Th1 cell, a type of T helper cells
 Tianhe-I (TH-1), a Chinese super computer
 TH1 the scripting language for web pages in fossil (software), the Fossil SCM
 Windows 10 Threshold 1
 TH-1, a character in The Source (Ayreon album)
 TH-1 (Phytophthora infestans), a subpopulation of the Ia mtDNA haplotype of the A2 mating type